The Commander of the Azerbaijani Land Forces is the administrative head in the Azerbaijani Land Forces, and is under the Chief of the General Staff and the Minister of Defence. The current Commander of the Land Forces is Lieutenant General Anvar Afandiyev.

List of commanders

References 

Azerbaijani military personnel
Azerbaijani generals
2021 establishments in Azerbaijan
Azerbaijan